Émile J. Bulteel (3 August 1906, in Tourcoing – 21 March 1978) was a French water polo player who competed in the 1928 Summer Olympics.

He played in five matches, and the French team went on to win the bronze medal.

See also
 List of Olympic medalists in water polo (men)

References

External links
 

1906 births
1978 deaths
Sportspeople from Tourcoing
French male water polo players
Olympic bronze medalists for France
Olympic water polo players of France
Water polo players at the 1928 Summer Olympics
Olympic medalists in water polo
Medalists at the 1928 Summer Olympics
20th-century French people